Dasyatis ushiei, the cow stingray or Ushi stingray, is a species of stingray known from a single specimen. Based on the single specimen, its range includes at least Mikawa Bay, Aichi Prefecture, middle Japan. Due to the limited knowledge of its biology and extent of capture in fisheries, this species is assessed as Data Deficient.

References

ushiei
Fish of the Pacific Ocean